Prospero Colonna, Duke of Rignano, Prince of Sonnino (18 July 1858 – 16 September 1937) was an Italian politician and aristocrat. He was twice mayor of Rome (1899–1905, 1914–1919). He served in the Chamber of Deputies and Senate of the Kingdom of Italy.

Biography
Prospero was born in Naples, son of Giovanni Andrea I Colonna, a landowner, and Isabella Alvarez di Toledo. He was descended from the House of Colonna, an ancient aristocratic family.

In his youth, he married Maria Ignazia Massimo. They had 3 children: , Piero (future Fascist politician) and Fabrizio.

In 1895, Colonna was elected to the Chamber of Deputies as the representative of Anagni. He supported the Historical Right. He resigned his charge in 1900. In the same year, Colonna became both a Senator and the Mayor of Rome.

During his term, Rome completed a streetcar line, including a passage under the Quirinal Hill.

In June 1904 the IOC's President Pierre de Coubertin chose Rome as the host for the IV Olympic Games, but Colonna refused due to the difficult status of the city treasury. Although he reached out to the government, the Prime Minister Giovanni Giolitti refused to help the city. Finally, Colonna resigned his office.

When the First World War started, Colonna joined in the Italian Royal Army as cavalry colonel. However, he never participated in battles, as he was appointed "military" mayor of Rome. In 1919, he resigned the office again and retired from politics. He died in 1937.

References

External links

1858 births
1937 deaths
20th-century Italian politicians
Mayors of Rome
Deputies of Legislature XIX of the Kingdom of Italy